The Lotus APX (APX stands for Aluminium Performance Crossover) is a concept car created by the British automobile marque, Lotus. It was first introduced at the 2006 Geneva Motor Show, and was also displayed as the Proton MSX. It is the first complete vehicle built on the new Versatile Vehicle Architecture (VVA). This vehicle is also a first for Lotus, as it is the first crossover SUV they have ever built. It was to have entered production as the Youngman Lotus T5, but was cancelled.

Engine
The APX uses a Lotus designed and developed 3.0 liter supercharged V6 engine. It can go from 0–60 mph (97 km/h) in 5 seconds. The APX's top speed is 152 mph (245 km/h). The suspension of the APX makes it perfect for off-road use (another first for the Lotus brand) with its permanent 4 wheel drive.

Also shown at the NADA 2007 show was an all-electric 4-wheel drive version of the APX, with 0–60 mph times of 4.8sec. They claim up to 9,000 recharge cycles and 1 penny per mile recharge costs.

Design
The APX exterior is all-aluminium. The interior features digital screens, futuristic gadgets, and many buttons.

References
Lotus APX Info from ConceptCarz.com
Lotus APX Demonstrator from Zapworld.com

APX
Concept cars
Cars introduced in 2006